In the 2016–17 season, the Bosnian football club FK Željezničar Sarajevo achieved second place in the Premier League of Bosnia and Herzegovina and reached the semi-finals of the Bosnia and Herzegovina Football Cup.

Squad statistics

Players

Total squad cost: €8.65M

From youth squad

Disciplinary record
Includes all competitive matches. The list is sorted by position, and then shirt number.

Goalscorers

Last updated: 28 May 2017

Assists

Last updated: 20 May 2017

Transfers

In 

Total expenditure:

Out 

Total income:  €180,000

Club

Coaching staff
{|
|valign="top"|

Other information

Competitions

Pre-season

Mid-season

Overall

Premijer Liga BiH

Regular season table

Results summary

Results by round

Matches

Championship round table

Results summary

Results by round

Matches

Kup Bosne i Hercegovine

Round of 32

Round of 16

Quarter-finals

Semi-finals

References

FK Željezničar Sarajevo seasons
Zeljeznicar